Zaozerny/Zaozyorny (masculine), Zaozernaya/Zaozyornaya (feminine), or Zaozernoye/Zaozyornoye (neuter) may refer to:
Zaozyorny Urban Settlement, a municipal formation which the district town of Zaozyorny in Rybinsky District of Krasnoyarsk Krai, Russia is incorporated as
Zaozerny (inhabited locality) (Zaozernaya, Zaozernoye), several inhabited localities in Russia
Zaozyornaya railway station, a railway station in Krasnoyarsk Krai, Russia
Zaozerny (volcano), a volcanic cone in Russia